Digital forensics is a branch of the forensic sciences related to the investigation of digital devices and media. Within the field a number of "normal" forensics words are re-purposed, and new specialist terms have evolved.

A

C

D

E

H

I

L

S

U

V

W

References

Digital forensics terms
Digital forensics
Wikipedia glossaries using description lists